Ramabai is a 2016 Indian biographical film in Kannada language, based on the life of Ramabai Ambedkar, the first wife of Indian social reformer and politician B. R. Ambedkar. The film is directed by M. Ranganath, and stars Yagna Shetty as the eponymous lead, and Siddaram Karnik as Ambedkar. The film released on the 14 April 2016 coinciding the birthday of Dr. Ambedkar.

Cast
 Yagna Shetty as Ramabai
 Dr. Sidram Karanik as B. R. Ambedkar
 Auditor Srinivas
 Nagaraj
 Bank Janardhan
 Sumathishree
 Mysore Ramanand

Production

Film producer Auditor Srinivas announced of making the film in February 2015. It was revealed that Vasudev Alur, predominantly a dialogue-writer in Kannada cinema, taking his original name M. Ranganath with the film, would direct it. In the same month, an audition was conducted by the makers to cast for supporting roles, in Bangalore. Yagna Shetty was cast to portray the role of Ramabai. Siddaram Karnik, an academician, who was researching on the life and work of B. R. Ambedkar at the time in Dharwad, was incidentally was cast play him in the film. Filming began on 27 March in Dharwad, following which it continued in Karwar, the two places where Ramabai and B. R. Ambedkar spent significant parts of their lives in, with the former having spent her final days in Dharwad. After a total of 30 days of filming, it completed by June 2015.

See also 
 Ramabai Bhimrao Ambedkar (film) - a 2011 Marathi language film on the same subject

References

2016 films
Indian biographical films
2010s Kannada-language films
Cultural depictions of B. R. Ambedkar
Films about B. R. Ambedkar
2010s biographical films